Lakselv Church is a parish church of the Church of Norway in Porsanger Municipality in Troms og Finnmark county, Norway. It is located in the village of Lakselv. It is one of the churches for the Porsanger parish which is part of the Indre Finnmark prosti (deanery) in the Diocese of Nord-Hålogaland. The white, wooden church was built in a long church style in 1963 using plans drawn up by the architect Eyvind Moestue. The church seats about 400 people.

History
The first chapel in Lakselv was built in 1865. It was constructed by local volunteer labor and it was consecrated on 2 October 1865. In 1897, the altarpiece from Kistrand Church was gifted to Lakselv chapel. The church was painted red until 1906 when it was painted white. In the late 1920s, the chapel was extensively renovated. It was re-consecrated on 14 September 1930. During World War II, the occupying German army stationed soldiers in Lakselv. On 20 September 1942, the chapel held its last service because after that time, the Germans took over the chapel and used it as a storage building. On 26 November 1944, Lakselv Chapel was burned to the ground by the German occupying forces as part of "the scorched earth tactics" that they employed as they retreated from Finnmark. After the war when funds were available, the church was rebuilt in 1963.

See also
List of churches in Nord-Hålogaland

References

Porsanger
Churches in Finnmark
Wooden churches in Norway
20th-century Church of Norway church buildings
Churches completed in 1963
1963 establishments in Norway
Long churches in Norway